Black Times: Voices of the National Community was an African-American monthly newspaper published by Khymme Kyongae in Albany, California. It was founded in 1971, and was published until approximately 1976. The publishing location moved to Menlo Park, and Palo Alto, California in later years.

History 
Jewish computer entrepreneur Eric L. Bakalinsky was named as the Chief executive officer (CEO) of the newspaper, and he later served as an editor. Theodore Walker was the editor from 1971 until 1972, followed by Khymme Kyongae (also known as Khymme Bakalinsky) in 1972. It was a monthly publication, with the goal of eventually becoming a weekly newspaper. 

It was described as, "a celebration of Black America for all, aimed at creating awareness of developments in the Black Community". The Black Times advertised a 'Subscribers' Satisfaction Director' named Ethiopia Brown, who would address any concerns. The newspaper ceased publication in approximately 1976 (or possibly as late as 1981).

See also 
 List of African-American newspapers in California
 Dr. Dobb's Journal, computer magazine occasionally edited by Eric L. Bakalinsky

References 

Defunct African-American newspapers
Defunct newspapers published in California
Newspapers published in the San Francisco Bay Area
Publications disestablished in 1976
Newspapers established in 1971
1976 disestablishments in California
1971 establishments in California